Lofa is a county in the northernmost portion of Liberia. One of 15 counties that constitute the first-level of administrative division in the nation, it has nine districts. As of the 2008 Census, it had a population of 276,863, making it the third most populous county in Liberia.

Lofa's County Superintendent is William Tamba Kamba. The county is bordered by Bong County to the south and Gbarpolu County to the west. The northwestern parts of Lofa border the nation of Sierra Leone and the northeastern parts border Guinea. Mount Wuteve, the highest mountain in Liberia, lies in the north-central part of the county.

History
Lofa County was established from the former Western Province in 1964. The civil war which began in 1989 adversely affected the county. Many people left the area as refugees in 1999 and the early 2000s as it became a main focus of fighting during the Liberian civil war. The Red Cross said that in January 2004 many people had begun to return from refugee camps in neighbouring Guinea and Sierra Leone. At that time the county's population was estimated to be 34,310. Pakistan Army UNMIL peacekeepers were in place by 2005.

The largest city and county capital is Voinjama with a population of 4,945. Foya is the second largest city (population 1,760).  Lofa produced one of the nations most respected leaders in the late vice president Dr. Harry F. Moniba who served from 1984 to 1990.

Geography

It is swampy along rivers and creeks, while there are patches of Savannah woodland. Rice and cassava interplanted with Sugarcane are the major crops grown in the region. It has three National proposed reserves, namely the Wologizi Mountain, Wonegizi Range and Foya Forest.

Demographics
As of 2008, the county had a population of 276,863: 133,611 male and 143,252 female. The sex ratio was 93.3 compared to 107.8 in 1994 census. The number of households during 2008 was 45,095 and the average size of the households was 5.5. The population was 9.50 per cent of the total population, while it was 8.00 per cent in 1994. The county had an area of 3,854 sq mi and the density per sq.mi was 72. The density during the 1984 census stood at 52. Liberia experienced civil war during various times and the total number of people displaced on account of wars as of 2008 in the county was 128,178. The number of people residing in urban areas was 83,150, with 40,592 males and 42,558 females. The total number of people in rural areas was 193,713, with 93,019 males and 100,694 females. The total fraction of people residing in urban areas was 30.03 per cent, while the remaining 070 per cent were living in rural areas. The number of people resettled as of 2008 was 32,959 while the number of people who were not resettled was 13,399. The number of literates above the age of ten as of 2008 was 79,196 while the number of illiterates was 66,907 making the literacy rate to 54.21. The total number of literate males was 47,865 while the total number of literate females was 31,331.

Economy
The total production stood at 8570 metric tonnes. As of 2011, the number of Cassava plantation was 9090, which was 7.4 per cent of the total area of Cassava planted in the country. The total production stood at 11250 metric tonnes. The number of Cocoa plantation was 11250, which was 29.1 per cent of the total area of Cassava planted in the country. The number of rubber plantation was 810, which was 1.3 per cent of the total area of Cassava planted in the country. The number of Coffee plantation was 11000, which was 49.3 per cent of the total area of Cassava planted in the country. As of 2008, the county had 4,323 paid employees, 38,287 self-employed people, 73,046 family workers, 4,565 people looking for work, 6,048 not working people, 23,682 people working in households, 40,653 students, 606 retired people, 4,951 incapacitated people, 1,582 part-time workers and 24,418 others, making the total working population of 222,161.

Administration
Lofa County has six districts (2008 population): Foya District (100,000), Kolahun District (59,057), Salayea District (22,968), Vahun District (16,876), Voinjama District (40,730), and Zorzor District (40,352). 
The Legislature of Liberia was modeled based on the Legislature of United States. It is bicameral in nature with a Senate and the House of Representatives. There are 13 counties in the country and based on the population, each county is defined to have at least two members, while the total number of members to the house including the Speaker being 64. Each member represents an electoral district and elected to a six-year term based on popular vote. There were 26 senators, two each for the 13 counties and they serve a nine-year term (30 senators, 15 counties and nine years from 2011). Senators are also elected based on plurality of votes. The Vice-President is the head of the Senate and he also acts as President in the President's absence.

Notes

References

External links
Place name codes

 
Counties of Liberia
1964 establishments in Liberia
 States and territories established in 1964